Esther Veronin (born 11 March 1987), is a Taiwanese director, singer, actress and CEO of entertainment startup Meimeiwawa Multimedia. She is the elder sister of singer Lara Veronin.

Career

In May 2013, Veronin and sister Lara Veronin founded Meimeiwawa Multimedia, ("Meiwa Media" for short), an entertainment and lifestyle themed start-up that creates multimedia content. Esther, as CEO and co-founder has directed all short and long-form content produced by Meimeiwawa, including their entries in the Taipei stop of the 48-hour film project, as well as their award-winning contribution to the Tainan 39 Hour Short Film Contestival, for which they received the accolade of ‘Best Cinematography’ in 2015.

In 2015, the sisters introduced a new online web series called ‘Meiwa Diaries’ under a new concept ‘Faux reality’, which depicts snippets of their daily lives in a partly fictional manner.

One of their first international film project was "Taipei As We Know It (TAWKI), an English-language webseries set in Taipei, Taiwan touching on social issues and quirks of the sisters' homeland, Taipei.

In 2018, Veronin wrote, directed, and produced her first feature-length film, "Tomorrow's Star", which starred her sister Lara and combined the music from Lara's third solo album "Thousand-Faced Beast" into a cinematic visual album.

Performance

During mid-2014, Veronin also participated in the "Global Taiwanese songwriting and singing competition", gaining attention for her similarity in appearance to Taiwanese actress Mirandu Lu, and for her moving performance.  Veronin also participated in the direction of sister Lara Veronin’s music video for her 2014 single "Dida", which was selected as the theme song for the "Fluid Sexuality International Film Festival" in 2015. Both sisters have publicly expressed their advocacy of LGBT rights.

Veronin also received glowing reviews of her performance in The LAB's stage performance of the 1966 play Wait Until Dark by Frederick Knott, having been praised by the Taipei Times to "shine in the challenging lead role".

From 2014 to 2015, both Veronin sisters sang regularly at Brown Sugar, a jazz club in Taipei, where they performed a medley of both Taiwanese and Western music.

Activism
Veronin is an outspoken participant in feminist and LGBT issues, having participated in many women-powered events in Taiwan. Both Veronin sisters also use Meimeiwawa Multimedia and their own popularity as platforms to raise awareness on various social issues via mediums such as events, music videos, short films, and movies.

Personal life
On 29 May 2015, Veronin's mother died after collapsing from a cardiac stress test.

Filmography
As CEO and Co-founder of Meimeiwawa, Veronin also takes on the roles of screenwriting, directing, editing, and producing various visual content put forth by the company. 
The genres of such visual content range from short films to music videos and even a feature film.

References

External links

 
 

Living people
1987 births
American actresses of Taiwanese descent
Taiwanese LGBT rights activists
Actresses from California
Taiwanese feminists
21st-century American women